This is a list of episodes for The Colbert Report in 2008.

2008

January
Due to the writers strike, the show went on hiatus on November 5, 2007. The show returned on January 7, 2008, without writers. The writers started again on February 13, 2008.

February

March

April
{|class="wikitable plainrowheaders" style="width:100%; margin:auto;"
|-
! style="background-color: #8B0000; color:#ffffff" width=5%   | No.
! style="background-color: #8B0000; color:#ffffff" width=10%  | ""
! style="background-color: #8B0000; color:#ffffff" width=20%  | Guest(s)
! style="background-color: #8B0000; color:#ffffff" width=40%  | Introductory phrase
! style="background-color: #8B0000; color:#ffffff" width=15%  | Original air date
! style="background-color: #8B0000; color:#ffffff" width=10%  | Production  code
|-

{{Episode list/sublist|List of The Colbert Report episodes (2008)
|EpisodeNumber=378
|ProdCode=4047
|Title=Black and White
|Aux2=Robin Wright
|Aux3="At the sound of the tone, the time will be 'tone time.'  BEEP!  This is The Colbert Report."
|OriginalAirDate=April 10
|ShortSummary=Stephen begins by mentioning General Petraeus' testimony to Congress.  He then discusses next week's shows being taped in Philadelphia, Pennsylvania and shows more drawings of the presidential candidates, done by children in Pennsylvania schools.  Stephen then talks about the "Santa Clausification" of Martin Luther King Jr. In "Tip of the Hat, Wag of the Finger," he wags his finger at talking fish, tips his hat to the black drum and wags his finger to Time'''s Time 100.  Finally, Stephen interviews Robin Wright about the future of the Middle East.

|LineColor=8B0000  }}

{{Episode list/sublist|List of The Colbert Report episodes (2008)
|EpisodeNumber=387
|ProdCode=4056
|Title=Kernel of Truth
|Aux2=Feist
|Aux3="A great man once said, 'This is The Colbert Report.' Wait, that was me.  This is The Colbert Report!"
|OriginalAirDate=April 28
|ShortSummary= Stephen begins by talking about Vanity Fair's photo shoot of Miley Cyrus. He then talks about Howard Dean's belief that the choice for the Democratic presidential nomination will not be based on the popular vote. In "The Wørd," Stephen talks about using ethanol to help fight climate change. In "Stephen Colbert's Sport Report," he talks about lumberjack sports. Stephen then talks to Feist about her career. Finally, she performs her latest single, "I Feel It All."

|LineColor=8B0000  }}

|}

May
On May 6, 2008, The Colbert Report'' debuted in the United Kingdom on FX.

June

July

August

September

October

November

December

References

External links

 
 

2008
2008 American television seasons